Humaid Abdulla Abbas (born 16 April 1988) is an Emirati footballer. He currently plays as a right-sided midfielder.

References

Emirati footballers
1988 births
Living people
Al-Nasr SC (Dubai) players
Al Ahli Club (Dubai) players
Al-Wasl F.C. players
Fujairah FC players
Hatta Club players
UAE Pro League players
Association football midfielders